Reason is the analytic faculty of the human mind that maintains objectivity unto inspecting and organizing perceptions.

Reason may also refer to:
 Rationality, the quality or state of being reasonable, based on facts or reason
 Reason (argument), a factor which justifies or explains
 The cause of some thing

Computing
 Reason (programming language), an alternative OCaml syntax and toolchain created at Facebook
 Reason (software), a digital music workstation program

Literature
 Reason (magazine), a monthly libertarian magazine published by the Reason Foundation
 "Reason" (short story), a 1941 science fiction short story by Isaac Asimov
 Reason: Why Liberals Will Win the Battle for America, a 2010 book by Robert Reich
 Reason: the Only Oracle of Man, a 1785 book by Ethan Allen
 Reason, a fictional weapon system from Neal Stephenson's novel Snow Crash Music 
 Reason (South African rapper) (born 1987), is a South African rapper
 Reason (rapper) (born 1990), American hip hop artist
 Reason (Nami Tamaki song), a 2004 song by Nami Tamaki
 Reason (Shaman album), a 2005 album by Brazilian power metal band Shamaan
 Reason (Officium Triste album), a 2004 album by doom metal band Officium Triste
 Reason (Yuzu song) a 2012 song by Yuzu
 Reason (Melanie C album), a 2003 album by singer Melanie C
 Reason (Violent Apathy album), 1995
 Reason (Selah Sue album), 2015
 Reason (No Angels song), a 2003 song by German pop band No Angels
 "Reason", a 2004 song by German dance trio Cascada
 "Reason", a 2018 song by South Korean singer Song I-han
 "Reason", a 2023 song by South Korean girl group Dreamcatcher
 "Reason", a bonus track on the Cranberries' album Everybody Else Is Doing It, So Why Can't We?''
 Reason (The Fray EP), a 2003 EP by The Fray
 Reason (Monsta X EP), a 2023 EP by Monsta X

Other
 The Reason Foundation, a public policy think tank based in Los Angeles, California, U.S.
 Order of the Reason, a medieval military order native to Spain
Reason (surname)
 Radar for Europa Assessment and Sounding: Ocean to Near-surface (REASON), a radar system on board NASA's Europa Clipper mission to Jupiter's moon Europa

See also 
 No Reason (disambiguation)
 Reasons (disambiguation)
 The Reason (disambiguation)